Gateshead Jewish Academy for Girls (Hebrew בית חיה רחל), is a two-year post-secondary school college, or "seminary". It was founded in Gateshead, England in 1998; its principal is Rabbi Avrohom Katz, an author and columnist.

It is an  Orthodox Jewish college, attracting Haredi  students from all around the world, with a dormitory and all long term in-living accommodations. Most students come from the United Kingdom but significant numbers come from other European countries. 
Students range in age from 16 - 21.

See Midrasha#Seminaries, for further discussion of this educational approach.

The academy also  provides  students with opportunities to take a range of AS/A Levels, GCSE and vocational qualifications in  partnership  with  a  local FE College.

References

Haredi Judaism in the United Kingdom
Judaism in England
Further education colleges in Tyne and Wear
Girls' schools in Tyne and Wear
Educational institutions established in 1998
1998 establishments in England
Education in Gateshead
Orthodox Jewish schools for women